Zpověď zapomenutého is a 2015 documentary film by Petr Václav about the life of Czech-Italian composer Josef Mysliveček. When screened at the FIPA International Competition in Biarritz in 2016, the film won the gold prize (FIPA d'or). It is also the winner of the 2016 Trilobit Award. A biographical film based on the life of Mysliveček with the title Il Boemo is in development, in collaboration with the Czech conductor Václav Luks, artistic director of the early music ensemble Collegium 1704, with a planned release in 2020.
Zpověď zapomenutého is narrated by Czech actor Karel Roden, who reads from personal letters and journal entries written by the composer.

According to Deník, "The film combines footage from Collegium 1704 rehearsals of Mysliveček's opera L'Olimpiade conducted by Luks in 2012 and 2013 at the Prague National Theatre, where the composer worked, and from various archives. Through letters, music, atmosphere and landscape, Václav reconstructs the life of a man who was a talented composer and an eternal wanderer with no background but also a lover of women and emoluments, which ultimately was his fatal undoing. Mysliveček's life journey and imaginary feelings, suggestively rendered by Karel Roden's pensive speech, illustrate the film's subject."

Moreover, Zpověď zapomenutého "captures the emergence of opera."

References

External links
 Confession of the Vanished (complete film, with English subtitles) on the official YouTube channel of the distribution company Pilot Film
 Petrželková, H., "Můj film si hraje s ohněm, říká Petr Václav o své novince s Rodenem a Vlasákovou" ("My film is playing with fire," says Petr Václav of his new documentary featuring Roden and Vlasáková), Lidové noviny, February 26, 2016.
 

Documentary films about classical music and musicians
Films about composers
Czech documentary films
2015 documentary films
2015 films